Big Brother VIP Kosova is a Kosovan reality game show based on the Dutch television show franchise Big Brother. The show follows a number of celebrity contestants, known as housemates, who are isolated from the outside world for an extended period of time in a custom built house. Each week, one of the housemates is evicted by a public vote, with the last housemate named the winner.

Big Brother VIP Kosova started airing on Klan Kosova on 5 December 2022. The show is hosted by Alaudin Hamiti and Jonida Vokshi.

History
In June 2022, it was announced that Big Brother will come for the first time in Kosovo on Klan Kosova and Artmotion, with a celebrity version under the name Big Brother VIP Kosova. The show is broadcast live 24/7 on two pay-per-view channels, Big Brother VIP Kosova 1 and Big Brother VIP Kosova 2, which are available on the Kosovan TV platform Artmotion, as well as on NimiTV and TVALB for the Albanian diaspora in other countries of Europe, United States and Canada.

On 27 June 2022, it was announced that Alaudin Hamiti will be the presenter of the live shows. On 14 September 2022, it was announced that Jonida Vokshi will be the second presenter of the live shows, alongside Hamiti.

On 18 September 2022, it was announced that Olti Curri will be the opinionist in the live shows. On 21 November 2022, it was announced that Afërdita Paqarada will be the second opinionist in the live shows, with Curri. Paqarada was replaced by Anita Haradinaj on 23 January 2023.

On 18 November 2022, it was announced that Elita Rudi will present the spin-off show Big Talk, which is broadcast every Sunday afternoon, for more in-depth discussions about the show.

Format 
Big Brother VIP is a game show in which a group of celebrity contestants, referred to as housemates, live in isolation from the outside world in a custom built "house", constantly under video surveillance. Access to television, the Internet, print media, and time is prohibited. In addition, the housemates live in complete confinement; they have no access to the outside world. Sometimes the viewers votes for their favorite housemates, and the housemates with the most votes had immunity. Also sometimes the housemates votes for their favorite housemate of house, and the housemate with the most votes had immunity. At least once a week, the housemates secretly nominate two housemates they wish to face a public vote to evict. The two or more housemates with the most votes face the public vote. The viewing public decides which of them gets evicted through text message votes or phone calls. The nominee with the most votes is evicted and leaves the house. Should their stay inside the house become difficult for them to bear, a housemate is allowed to voluntarily leave at any time during the game. In the event of a withdrawal from the house, a replacement housemate usually enters in their place. In the final week of each season, the viewers vote for which of the remaining people in the house should win the prize money of €200,000 and be crowned the winner of Big Brother VIP.

Housemates  
On Day 1, fourteen housemates entered the house during launch.

Nominations table

References

External links 
Official Website
 

2020s Kosovan television series
Kosovan reality television series
Klan Kosova original programming
Celebrity Big Brother
Television shows set in Kosovo
Television shows filmed in Kosovo